William Hamzy (born January 4, 1966) is an American politician who served in the Connecticut House of Representatives from the 78th district from 1995 to 2011.

References

1966 births
Living people
Republican Party members of the Connecticut House of Representatives